The Standard for the Uniform Scheduling of Medicines and Poisons (SUSMP) is an Australian legislative instrument produced by the Therapeutic Goods Administration (TGA). Before 2010, it was known as the Standard for the Uniform Scheduling of Drugs and Poisons (SUSDP). The SUSMP classifies drugs and poisons into different Schedules signifying the degree of control recommended to be exercised over their availability to the public. , the most recent version is the Poisons Standard October 2022.

The Schedules are referred to under State and Territory legislation for regulatory purposes. Although each State and Territory has its own laws, the vast majority of medicines and poisons are classified according to the SUSMP to achieve uniform national regulation.

Schedules

Schedule 1 
Schedule 1 is blank. Schedule 1 does not currently contain any medicines or poisons.

Schedule 2: Pharmacy Medicine 
Schedule 2 (S2) drugs and poisons, otherwise known as Pharmacy Medicines, are substances and preparations for therapeutic use that –
 are substantially safe in use but where advice or counselling is available if necessary;
 are for minor ailments or symptoms that –
 can be easily recognised by the consumer and
 do not require medical diagnosis or management.
Examples:
 Dextromethorphan, a cough suppressant 
 Simple analgesics such as aspirin, paracetamol and ibuprofen in packs containing more than 24 tablets (packs containing up to 24 tablets of simple analgesics are unscheduled, and can be sold in any shop)
 Hyoscine, used to treat motion sickness, postoperative nausea and vomiting.
 Nonsedating antihistamines such as loratadine
 Nasal sprays containing decongestants or steroids

The SUSMP March 2018 defines a Schedule 2 substance as "Substances, the safe use of which may require advice from a pharmacist and which should be available from a pharmacy or, where a pharmacy service is not available, from a licensed person."

The location of these medications in the pharmacy varies from state to state.

Schedule 3: Pharmacist Only Medicine 
Schedule 3 (S3) drugs and poisons, otherwise known as Pharmacist Only Medicines, are substances and preparations for therapeutic use that –
 are substantially  safe in use but require professional advice or counselling by a pharmacist;
 require pharmacist advice, management, or monitoring;
 are for ailments or symptoms that –
 can be identified by the consumer and verified by a pharmacist;
 do not require medical diagnosis, or only require initial medical diagnosis, and do not require close medical management.

Some states have subsets of Schedule 3 with additional requirements (see below). Only some Schedule 3 medicines may be advertised to the public.

Examples:
 Orlistat (trade name Xenical)
 Pseudoephedrine (marketed in Cold and Flu preparations)
 Salbutamol (Ventolin/Asmol)

Schedule 4: Prescription Only Medicine 
Schedule 4 (S4) drugs and poisons, otherwise known as prescription only medicines, are substances and preparations for therapeutic use that –
 require professional medical, dental, or veterinary management or monitoring;
 are for ailments or symptoms that require professional medical, dental, or veterinary diagnosis or management;
 may require further evaluation for safety or efficacy;
 are new therapeutic substances.
 cost of the drug is high, or when there is a risk of dependence
The price of many Schedule 4 substances are subsidized by the Australian Government through the Pharmaceutical Benefits Scheme (PBS), when prescribed by an authorized prescriber. Certain medications may require an authority from the PBS. Situations that may require an authority include where the drug may only have benefit in limited conditions, the true cost of the drug is high, or when there is a risk of dependence. Some states have subsets of Schedule 4 with additional requirements (see below). Schedule 4 medicines cannot be advertised directly to the public.

Examples:

 Amoxicillin
 Anabolic steroids
 Apomorphine
 Cannabidiol in preparations for therapeutic use containing 2 percent or less of other cannabinoids found in cannabis (since June 2015)
 Cisplatin
 Co-codamol preparations comprising codeine and paracetamol
 Ephedrine
 Ergotamine
 Oestradiol
 Fluticasone
 Ibogaine
 Isotretinoin
 Methoxyflurane
 Pseudoephedrine in large doses
 Salmeterol
 Tramadol
 Tretinoin
 Trimethoprim
 All benzodiazepines except flunitrazepam and alprazolam
 All:
SSRIs (e.g. fluoxetine, citalopram),
SNRIs (e.g. duloxetine, milnacipran),
TCAs (e.g. amitriptyline, imipramine)
MAOIs (e.g. selegiline, moclobemide).
 Antipsychotic drugs (e.g. aripiprazole, quetiapine)

Schedule 5: Caution 
Schedule 5 (S5) drugs and poisons are substances and preparations that must have appropriate packaging and simple warning labels to display that these poisons:
 have low toxicity or a low concentration;
 have a low to moderate hazard;
 can cause only minor adverse effects to the human being in normal use;
 require caution in handling, storage, or use.
Examples:

 Ammonia 
 Acetic acid (>30%)
 Boric acid
 Chlorinating compounds 
 Clove oil
 Ivermectin (for use in animals)
 Lidocaine
 Methylated Spirits
 Petrol

Some of the above examples are subject to exceptions dependant on the specific preparation, concentration, or inclusion in other schedules.

Schedule 6: Poison 
Must use distinctive packaging and strong warnings to display the potential for:
 moderate to high toxicity;
 that may cause death or severe injury if ingested, inhaled, or in contact with the skin or eyes.
Examples:

 Arsenic
 Beryllium
 Bromethalin
 Chloroform
 Cyanamide
 Safrole
 Toluene
 Xylene
 Ziram

Some of the above examples are subject to exceptions dependant on the specific preparation, concentration, or inclusion in other schedules.

Schedule 7: Dangerous Drug 
Substances with a high potential for causing harm at low exposure and which:
 Require special precautions for manufacture, handling or use; or
 Only available to specialised and authorised users with appropriate skills
 Special regulations regarding their availability, possession, storage or use may apply
Examples:

 Azo Dyes
 Benzene
 Chlorine
 Demeton
 Phosphine
 Vinyl Chloride

Some of the above examples are subject to exceptions dependant on the specific preparation, concentration, or inclusion in other schedules.

Schedule 8: Controlled Drug  
Schedule 8 (S8) drugs and poisons, otherwise known as Controlled Drugs, are schedule 9 prohibited substances that are appropriate preparations for therapeutic use which have high potential for abuse and addiction. The possession of these medications without authority is the same as carrying a prohibited substance and is illegal.

Like schedule 4 substances, the price of many Schedule substances are subsidized through the Pharmaceutical Benefits Scheme (PBS), some of which may require an authority. In addition, in some states, all drugs on schedule 8 require a doctor to have an S8 permit before prescribing treatment.  For example, in NSW the prescribing of Schedule 8 CNS stimulant medication (e.g., methylphenidate, dexamfetamine) requires authorisation from the NSW Ministry of Health (Pharmaceutical Services) and is generally restricted to specialists, such as paediatricians and psychiatrists.  A GP (General Practitioner) cannot initiate the treatment, although they can  prescribe in very limited circumstances, e.g. co-prescribing on behalf of the specialist; and in rural areas, if the patient has been diagnosed with ADHD, a GP may apply for the authority to prescribe.  Patients who may require Schedule 8 CNS stimulant medication should be referred to a specialist for assessment.

Examples:
 Alprazolam
 Amphetamine
 Barbiturates (most)
 Buprenorphine / Suboxone
Carfentanil
Cocaine
 Codeine (single ingredient)
 Dexamfetamine
 Dronabinol
 Fentanyl
 Flunitrazepam
 GHB
 Hydrocodone
 Hydromorphone
Ketamine
 MDMA
 Methamphetamine
 Methylphenidate
 Morphine
 Nabiximols
 Opium
 Oxycodone
 Pethidine
 Psilocin
 Psilocybin

Schedule 9: Prohibited Substance 
Schedule 9 (S9) drugs and poisons are substances and preparations that, by law, may only be used for research purposes. The sale, distribution, use, and manufacture of such substances without a permit is strictly prohibited by law. Permits for research uses on humans must be approved by a recognized ethics committee on human research.

Examples:
 2C-B
 Benzylpiperazine
 Bromo-DragonFLY
 Cannabis, except when separately specified in other Schedules
Coca leaf
 DMT
 Harmine/Harmaline
 Heroin
Kratom, also known as Mitragyna speciosa; as well its main alkaloid Mitragynine 
 MDPV
Mephedrone
Mescaline
 Methaqualone
 Methoxypiperamide
 LSD
 Salvia divinorum

Schedule 10: Substances of such danger to health as to warrant prohibition of sale, supply and use 
Schedule 10 was known as Appendix C until the introduction of the Poisons Standard 2015. It includes substances of such danger to health as to warrant prohibition of sale, supply and use. Examples are:

 Borage for therapeutic use except the fixed oil derived from the seeds of Borago officinalis. 
 Coal tar for cosmetic use other than in therapeutic goods.
 Juniperus sabina for therapeutic use
 Oxyphenisatin for therapeutic use
 2,4-Dinitrophenol for human use

As of 15 August 2022, Schedule 10 includes each of the following substances:

 Abrus precatorius (Jequirity) seed or root for therapeutic use.
 Acorus calamus (calamus) for human therapeutic use.
 Alkaline Salts, being the carbonate, silicate or phosphate salts of sodium or potassium alone or in any combination for domestic use: 
a) in liquid or semi-solid food additive preparations, the pH of which is more than 11.5; 
b) in solid automatic dishwashing preparations, the pH of which in a 500 g/L aqueous solution or mixture is more than 12.5; or 
c) in liquid or semi-solid automatic dishwashing preparations, the pH of which is more than 12.5. 
 Alkylamines WITH STIMULANT PROPERTIES except when separately specified in these schedules. 
 Allylisopropylacetylurea for therapeutic use. 2-AMINO-5-METHYLPHENOL in preparations for cosmetic use. 
 Aminophenazone (amidopyrine) and its derivatives for human therapeutic use. 
 Amygdalin for therapeutic use.
 Anchusa officinalis for therapeutic use. 
 o-Anisidine (excluding derivatives) in preparations for skin colouration (including tattooing) and dyeing of hair, eyelashes or eyebrows except in preparations containing 0.001 per cent or less of o-anisidine. 
 Aristolochia spp. for therapeutic use. 
 Aristolochic acid for human therapeutic use. 
 Asarum spp. containing aristolochic acid(s) for human therapeutic use. 
 Azadirachta indica (neem) including its extracts and derivatives, in preparations for human internal use except debitterised neem seed oil. 
 Basic Orange 31 (2-[(4-aminophenyl)azo]-1,3-dimethyl-1H-imidazolium chloride) in preparations for skin colouration and dyeing of eyelashes or eyebrows. 
 1,2-BENZENEDIAMINE in preparations for cosmetic use and skin colouration (including tattooing). 
 1,3-BENZENEDIAMINE in preparations for cosmetic use and skin colouration (including tattooing). 
 Bithionol for human therapeutic use. 
 Bragantia spp. containing aristolochic acid(s) for human therapeutic use. 
 Buclosamide for therapeutic use. 
 Buniodyl Sodium for therapeutic use. 
 1,4-Butanediol (excluding its derivatives) in non-polymerised form in preparations for domestic use. 
 Benzyl butyl phthalate for cosmetic use. 
 Cacalia spp. for therapeutic use. 
 Carbamide Peroxide (excluding its salts and derivatives) in teeth whitening preparations containing more than 18 per cent of carbamide peroxide except in preparations manufactured for, and supplied solely by, registered dental practitioners as part of their dental practice. 
 Cardarine. 
 Chrysoidine Base in preparations for use in hair dyes. 
 Cinchophen and its derivatives for therapeutic use. 
 Clioquinol and other halogenated derivatives of oxyquinoline for human internal use except or when being used solely for experimental purposes in humans and where such use: 
a) is in accordance with: 
i) an approval granted under paragraph 19(1)(b) of the Therapeutic Goods Act 1989, including any conditions specified in the notice of approval; and 
ii) any conditions specified in the Therapeutic Goods Regulations 1990 for the purposes of subsection 19(1A) of the Therapeutic Goods Act 1989; and 
iii) any conditions specified in the Therapeutic Goods Regulations 1990 for the purposes of subsection 19(4A) of the Therapeutic Goods Act 1989; or 
b)is in accordance with the requirements of item 3 of Schedule 5A to the Therapeutic Goods Regulations 1990.
 Conium maculatum (coniine) for therapeutic use. 
 Cotarnine for therapeutic use. 
 Crotalaria spp. for therapeutic use. 
 Croton tiglium for therapeutic use. 
 Cynoglossum spp. for therapeutic use. 
 Dibutyl phthalate for cosmetic use. 
 Dicophane (DDT) for therapeutic use. 
 Diethylene glycol for use in toothpastes or mouthwashes except in preparations containing 0.25 per cent or less of diethylene glycol. 
 2-(2-Methoxyethoxy)ethanol for cosmetic use. 
 Bis(2-ethylhexyl) phthalate for cosmetic use. 
 Diethyl phthalate in sunscreens, personal insect repellents or body lotion preparations for human use except in preparations containing 0.5 per cent or less of diethylphthalate. 
 5,6-Dihydroxyindole for cosmetic use in preparations containing more than 2 per cent of 5,6-dihydroxyindoline. 
 Diiodohydroxyquinoline (iodoquinol) for human internal use. 
 Diisobutyl phthalate for cosmetic use. 
 Methylhexanamine (DMAA). 
 1,3-Dimethylbutylamine (DMBA) except when separately specified in these schedules. 
 1-(1,1-dimethylethyl)-2-methoxy-4-methyl-3,5-dinitrobenzene (musk ambrette). 
 1,5-dimethylhexylamine (DMHA) except when separately specified in these schedules. 
 1,4-Dimethylpentylamine (DMPA). 
 Dimethyl phthalate in sunscreens, personal insect repellents or body lotion preparations for human use except in preparations containing 0.5 per cent or less of dimethylphthalate. 
 di(methoxyethyl) phthalate for cosmetic use. 
 2,4-Dinitrophenol for human use. 
 Disperse Yellow 3 for use in hair dyes. 
 Dulcin for therapeutic use. 
 Ethylene glycol for use in toothpastes or mouthwashes except in preparations containing 0.25 per cent or less of ethylene glycol. 
 Eupatorium cannabinum (Hemp Agrimony) for therapeutic use. 
 Farfugium japonicum for therapeutic use. 
 Formaldehyde (excluding its derivatives): 
a) in oral hygiene preparations containing more than 0.1 per cent of free formaldehyde; 
b) in aerosol sprays for cosmetic use containing 0.005 per cent or more of free formaldehyde; 
c) in nail hardener cosmetic preparations containing 5 per cent or more of free formaldehyde; or 
d) in all other cosmetic preparations containing 0.05 per cent or more of free formaldehyde except in preparations containing 0.2 per cent or less of free formaldehyde when labelled with the warning statement: CONTAINS FORMALDEHYDE. 
 gamma-Butyrolactone (excluding its derivatives) in non-polymerised form in preparations for domestic and cosmetic use. 
 Heliotropium spp. for therapeutic use. 
 Hydrogen peroxide (excluding its salts and derivatives) in teeth whitening preparations containing more than 6 per cent (20 volume) of hydrogen peroxide except in preparations manufactured for, and supplied solely by, registered dental practitioners as part of their dental practice. 
 Isopropyl nitrite. 
 Juniperus sabina [savin(e)] for therapeutic use. 
 Kambo. 
 Lead Compounds: 
a) in anti-fouling or anti-corrosive paints except in preparations containing 0.1 per cent or less of lead calculated on the non-volatile content of the paint; or 
b) in paints (other than anti-fouling or anti-corrosive paints), tinters, inks or ink additives except in preparations containing 0.009 per cent or less of lead calculated on the non-volatile content of the paint, tinter, ink or ink additive. 
 Ligularia dentata for therapeutic use. 
 Melia azedarach including its extracts and derivatives. 
 Methanol in hand sanitiser preparations containing more than 5 per cent methanol. 
 Methyldibromo glutaronitrile in preparations intended to be in contact with the skin, including cosmetic use.
 Methyl methacrylate for cosmetic use except in preparations containing 1 per cent or less of methyl methacrylate as residual monomer in a polymer. 
 Methylrosanilinium chloride (formerly known as crystal violet CAS No. 548-62-9) and the following 
 Triarylmethane dye – for use in hair dyes: - Acid Violet 49 (CAS No. 1694-09-3), - Ethyl Violet (CAS No. 2390-59-2), - Basic Blue 7 (CAS No. 2390-60-5), - Basic Blue 26 (CI 44045) (CAS No. 2580-56-5). 
 Naphthalene (excluding derivatives) in preparations in block, ball, disc, pellet or flake form for domestic use except when enclosed in a device which, in normal use, prevents removal or ingestion of its contents. 
 Oxyphenisatine for therapeutic use. 
 Paraformaldehyde (excluding its derivatives): a)      in oral hygiene preparations containing more than 0.1 per cent of free formaldehyde; b)      in aerosol sprays for cosmetic use containing 0.005 per cent or more of free formaldehyde; c)      in nail hardener cosmetic preparations containing 5 per cent or more of free formaldehyde; d)      in all other cosmetic preparations containing 0.05 per cent or more of free formaldehyde except in preparations containing 0.2 per cent or less of free formaldehyde when labelled with the warning statement:                         CONTAINS FORMALDEHYDE. 
 Petasites spp. for therapeutic use. 
 Phenpromethamine. 
 p-Phenylenediamine, including alkylated, arylated, halogenated and nitro derivatives, in preparations for skin colouration, tattooing and dyeing of eyelashes or eyebrows except when included in Schedule 6. 
 Potassium hydroxide (excluding its salts and derivatives), in liquid or semi-solid food additive preparations, for domestic use, the pH of which is more than 11.5. n-
 Propyl nitrite. 
 Bracken (Pteridium) spp. for therapeutic use. 
 Pulmonaria spp. for therapeutic use.
 Safrole for internal therapeutic use except in preparations containing 0.1 per cent or less of safrole. 
 Sanguinaria (bloodroot) in preparations for human use except in preparations containing 0.01 per cent or less of SANGUINARINE. 
 Senecio spp. for therapeutic use. SILICONES for injection or implantation except when included in Schedule 4. 
 Sodium hydroxide (excluding its salts and derivatives), in liquid or semi-solid food additive preparations, for domestic use, the pH of which is more than 11.5. 
 Symphytum spp. (Comfrey) in preparations for human or animal use except when in Schedule 5. 
 2,4-Diaminotoluene in preparations for skin colouration (including tattooing) and dyeing of hair, eyelashes or eyebrows.
 Toluenediamine in preparations for skin colouration (including tattooing) and dyeing of eyelashes or eyebrows except when included in Schedule 6. 
 o-Toluidine (excluding derivatives) in preparations for skin colouration (including tattooing) and dyeing of hair, eyelashes or eyebrows except in preparations containing 0.001 per cent or less of o-toluidine. 
 1,1,1-Trichloroethane in pressurised spray packs for therapeutic use. 
 Trichodesma africana for therapeutic use. 
 Triparanol for therapeutic use. 
 Tussilago farfara for therapeutic use.

Unscheduled substances 
Unscheduled substances do not belong to any of the above schedules. Many of these preparations are also sold in supermarkets in addition to pharmacies. Some may be age-restricted under other laws.

Examples:
 Antacids
 Alcohol (ethanol)
 Caffeine
 Ephenidine
 Hydroxymorphinan
 Ranitidine in small packs (larger packs are schedule) 
 Paracetamol 500 mg in small packs (<24; larger packs are schedule 2)
 Some laxatives (e.g. bulk laxatives Metamucil)
 Lubricant eye drops
 Nicotine replacement therapy (some preparations are schedule 2)

Interstate variations

New South Wales 
In New South Wales, poisons are proclaimed in the Poisons List by the Poisons Advisory Committee, under the authority of the Poisons and Therapeutic Goods Act 1966 (NSW). NSW legislation refers to S2 as "medicinal poisons", S3 as "potent substances", S4 as "restricted substances" and S8 as "drugs of addiction".

Schedule 3 Recordable 
Schedule 3 Recordable (S3R), or "recordable potent substances", refers to Pharmacist Only Medicines where supply is recorded as for Schedule 4 drugs. S3R drugs are those that may have an increased risk of illegal diversion or abuse. These are specified in Clause 23 of the Poisons and Therapeutic Goods Regulation 2002 (NSW). As of January 2006, all pseudoephedrine-containing preparations are S3R. Rikodeine cough syrup also falls into category which contains Dihydrocodeine and Sorbitol.

Schedule 4 Appendix D 
Schedule 4, Appendix D (S4D) refers to Prescription Only Medicines that do not have sufficient addictiveness or risk of abuse to be classified as S8, but for which a significant addiction/abuse risk exists. As such, S4D drugs are subject to additional prescription and recording requirements over S4. These drugs are referred to as "prescribed restricted substances" under the Poisons and Therapeutic Goods Regulation 2002 (NSW) and are listed in Appendix D of the Regulation. Drugs included in Appendix D include benzodiazepines, anabolic steroids, gabapentinoids and opiates. A subset of Appendix D are the Appendix B substances, which are subject to similar requirements as S8 drugs.

South Australia

Recordable S3 products (Schedule G) 
In South Australia, supply of certain S3 preparations listed in Schedule G of the Controlled Substances (Poisons) Regulations 1996 (SA) are recordable under Regulation 14(2). As of 2006, Schedule G products specified are: adrenaline (in metered aerosols), dihydrocodeine (in cough preparations), doxylamine (in preparations also containing codeine), promethazine (in preparations also containing codeine), and pseudoephedrine.

Western Australia

Recordable S3 products (Appendix J) 
In Western Australia, supply of certain S3 preparations listed in Appendix J of the Poisons Regulations 1965 (WA) are recordable under Regulation 35A. As of 2006, Appendix J products specified are: hydrocortisone, hydrocortisone acetate, pseudoephedrine, and nicotine preparations were included in Schedule 3.

See also 
 Regulation of therapeutic goods
 Prohibition of drugs
 Illicit drug use in Australia

Notes

References 

 Bullock, S & Manias, E. (2011). Fundamentals of Pharmacology (6th ed). Pearson Australia: Frenchs Forest, NSW

Drug policy of Australia
Pharmacy in Australia